The Trumpet of the Swan is a 2001 American animated drama film produced by Nest Family Entertainment and RichCrest Animation Studios, directed by Richard Rich & Terry L. Noss, and distributed by TriStar Pictures.

Premise
Based on E. B. White's popular children's book of the same name, it tells the story of a young trumpeter swan who is born with muteness and is vying for the attention of a beautiful pen. He overcomes this by learning to play the trumpet.

Cast
 Dee Bradley Baker as Louie
 Jason Alexander as Father
 Mary Steenburgen as Mother
 Reese Witherspoon as Serena
 Seth Green as Boyd
 Carol Burnett as Mrs. Hammerbotham
 Joe Mantegna as Monty
 Sam Gifaldi as Sam Beaver
 Melissa Disney as Billie
 Kath Soucie as Serena (cygnet) / Paramedic / Newscaster
 E. G. Daily as Ella
 Pamela Segall Adlon as A.G. Skinner
 Steve Vinovich as Maurice / Roger
 Gary Anthony Williams as Sweets
 Corey Burton as Senator
 Michael Winslow as Chief
 David Jeremiah as Squirrel / Hawk
 Julie Nathanson as Felicity
 Dana Daurey as Apathy
 Michael Kostroff as Waiter
 Lee Magnuson as Clerk
 Steve Franken as Bud
 Norman Parker as Policeman
 Jack Angel as Justice of the Geese

Release

Critical reception
The Trumpet of the Swan received mostly negative reviews from critics. On Rotten Tomatoes, the film scored a 15% 'Rotten' rating. The site's critical consensus says "An uninspired E.B. White adaptation that's targeted at the very young."

Box office
By the end of its run, The Trumpet of the Swan grossed a mere $628,387.

Awards and nominations
In 2001, it was nominated by the Casting Society of America for best voice-casting in an animated film, but lost the award to Disney's The Emperor's New Groove. It is notable, however, that an independent animated film would be able to win such a nomination. It was the last film based on a book by E. B. White until 2006's Charlotte's Web.

References

External links

 
  
 

2001 films
2001 animated films
American children's animated fantasy films
American children's animated musical films
Films directed by Richard Rich
American independent films
TriStar Pictures animated films
TriStar Pictures films
Films based on children's books
2000s American animated films
Films based on American novels
Animated films about birds
Animated films about friendship
Films about summer camps
Films set in Boston
Films set in Montana
Films based on novels by E. B. White
2000s English-language films